Sir Clifford de Lisle Inniss (26 October 1910 – 21 December 1998) was a Barbadian cricketer and lawyer.

Inniss was born at Friendly Hall, Saint Michael, Barbados, and attended Harrison College in Bridgetown. He was a right-handed batsman who played a few matches of first-class cricket for Barbados from 1927-28 to 1938-39. His highest scores were the 72 and 80 he made against British Guiana in 1929-30. While studying law at Oxford University in 1933 he joined the West Indian touring team for their first-class matches early in the tour against Oxford University in Oxford and against MCC at Lord's. He and George Headley put on 149 for the third wicket against MCC.

He became a QC, and later served as Chief Justice of British Honduras. He died in Belmopan, the capital of Belize, aged 88. His brother, Bruce de Lisle Inniss, played one match for Barbados in 1942.

References

External links
 
 

1910 births
1998 deaths
Barbados cricketers
People educated at Harrison College (Barbados)
Oxfordshire cricketers
Barbadian Queen's Counsel
Chief Justices of British Honduras